This is a list of mascots. A mascot is any person, animal, or object thought to bring luck, or anything used to represent a group with a common public identity, such as a school, professional sports team, society, military unit, or brand name.

College
See: List of colleges by mascot
See: List of U.S. college mascots, which lists the names of college mascots
See: List of college sports teams in the United States with different nicknames for men's and women's teams

Computing
See: List of computing mascots

Sports

Olympics

Paralympic

FIFA World Cup

Major League Baseball

National Football League

National Hockey League

National Basketball Association

Association Football

Other
 Freedom Frog - mascot of Intervention Helpline, an Alaska counseling nonprofit organization
 Zé Gotinha - Brazilian mascot created to promote vaccination campaigns against the polio virus
 Senhor Testiculo - a Brazilian pair of testicles, mascot of a cancer prevention organization

See also

 List of Australian mascots
 List of breakfast cereal advertising characters
 List of colleges by mascot
 List of computing mascots
 List of national animals
 List of Olympic mascots
 List of Paralympic mascots
 List of U.S. college mascots
 List of video game mascots
 Mascot Hall of Fame
 Military mascots

References

Mascots, List of

Mascots

de:Liste der Maskottchen